Philippe Venault (7 April 1947 – 3 April 2021) was a French director and screenwriter.

References

French directors
French male screenwriters
1947 births
2021 deaths